Gell is a surname, and may refer to:

 Alan Gell, American sentenced to death for murder, released when trial evidence proven flawed
 Alfred Gell (1945–1997), British social anthropologist
 David Gell (born 1929), Canadian DJ and television presenter
 Edith Mary Gell (1866–1944), English writer and Christian activist
 Harry Dickson Gell (1845–1929), accountant in South Australia
Heather Gell (1896–1988), daughter of Harry Dickson Gell, Australian kindergarten teacher, eurhythmics pioneer and broadcaster
 John Gell (disambiguation)
 Mary Gell (1894–1978), a medical missionary
 Murray Gell-Mann (1929–2019), American Nobel Prize-winning physicist
 Philip Gell (disambiguation)
 Rob Gell (born 1952), Australian meteorologist and TV weather presenter
 William Gell (1777–1836), English archaeologist and illustrator

See also
 Gell baronets
 Gel